Melanostomias globulifer, the brightchin dragonfish, is a species of fish native to the Western Pacific.

References 

Fish described in 1934